Salla Sportive Bathore is a purpose-built basketball arena built in 2013 in Bathore, Tirana, Albania. It is the home of BC Kamza Basket and is owned by the Kamëz Municipality.

History
The first game at the arena was held on 22 March 2013 between BC Kamza Basket and BC Teuta Durrës, where tickets were free in order to sell out all 400 seats.

References

Indoor arenas in Albania
Basketball venues in Albania
Indoor track and field venues
Buildings and structures in Kamëz